Maktub is a 2017 Israeli comedy film directed by Oded Raz and written by Guy Amir and Hanan Savyon. The plot revolves around two gangsters, Steve (Hanan Savyon) and Chuma (Guy Amir). When visiting a restaurant in Jerusalem, a terrorist attack kills everyone at the restaurant except them. This event makes Steve and Chuma reevaluate what they do for a living.

Cast 
 Guy Amir as Chuma
 Hanan Savyon as Steve
 Gal Amitai as Yiftach
 Chen Amsalem as Lizo
 Edna Blilious as Bruria
 Itzik Cohen as Elkaslasi
 Anastasia Fein as Doniasha
 Eli Haviv as Micky
 Igal Naor as Tzafuf

Release
Maktub was released on June 16, 2018.

References

External links 
 
 

2017 films
2017 comedy films
Israeli comedy films